Timur Marselevich Safin (born 4 August 1992) is a Russian right-handed foil fencer. 

He is a two-time team European champion and 2016 individual European champion. A two-time Olympian, Safin is a 2021 team Olympic silver medalist, 2016 team Olympic champion, and 2016 individual Olympic bronze medalist.

Career
Safin, who is of Tatar descent, took up fencing when he was nine years old after a coach came to make a presentation at his school. He specialized in foil, joining the junior Russian team in 2009. He earned an individual bronze medal and a team silver medal in the 2011 U23 European Championships in Kazan. He won a team silver medal in the 2012 Junior European Championships and was crowned Junior World champion the same year in Moscow. 

In the senior category, he made his breakthrough in the 2013–14 season. He won the Challenge Revenu after defeating in the final team Olympic champion Andrea Baldini. At the 2014 European Championships in Strasbourg, he was defeated in the table of 16 by eventual gold winner James-Andrew Davis, and in the team event he helped Russia conquer a bronze medal. In the 2014 World Championships in Kazan he made his way to the semifinals, defeating along the way German champion Peter Joppich. He lost by a single hit to world no.1 Ma Jianfei of China and came away with a bronze medal. For this performance he was named breakthrough of the year by the Russian Fencing Federation.

Medal Record

Olympic Games

World Championship

European Championship

Grand Prix

World Cup

References

External links

 
  (archive)
  (archive)
 
 
 

1992 births
Living people
Russian male foil fencers
Sportspeople from Tashkent
Fencers at the 2015 European Games
European Games medalists in fencing
European Games bronze medalists for Russia
Olympic medalists in fencing
Olympic gold medalists for Russia
Olympic bronze medalists for Russia
Medalists at the 2016 Summer Olympics
Fencers at the 2016 Summer Olympics
Olympic fencers of Russia
Fencers at the 2020 Summer Olympics
Medalists at the 2020 Summer Olympics
Olympic silver medalists for the Russian Olympic Committee athletes
Tatar people of Russia
Tatar sportspeople
Volga Tatar people